The 1981–82 Phoenix Suns season was the 14th season for the Phoenix Suns of the National Basketball Association. The Suns were in the playoffs for the fifth consecutive season, extending a then-franchise record. In the first round, Denver was taken down by the Suns, two games to one. Phoenix would find a tougher opponent, however, in the Western Conference Semifinals, getting swept four games to zero by the eventual league champions, Los Angeles Lakers. The Suns were led by head coach John MacLeod and played all home games in Arizona Veterans Memorial Coliseum.

Dennis Johnson again earned NBA All-Defensive First Team honors and was the lone All-Star Game participant from the Suns. Additionally, he led the Suns in scoring with his 19.5 points average, a personal career-high. Truck Robinson was not far behind with his 19.1 average, and paired that with rebounding average of 9.7 a game. Fellow big man Alvan Adams brought in 7 rebounds and 15 points a contest.

Offseason

NBA draft

Roster

† – Minimum 20 field goals made.
^ – Minimum 10 free throws made.

Transactions

Trades

Free agents

Additions

Subtractions

References
 Standings on Basketball Reference

Phoenix Suns seasons
Ph